The Saint Just de Bretenières–St. Juste Maine Border Crossing is primarily used by Canadian logging trucks to access the privately owned land in Maine.  This crossing was opened in 2003 when it was determined that access for logging operations was better at this location than at Daaquam about 3 miles to the north.  New facilities were built at St. Juste and the border services staff were moved there.  The Daaquam crossing was closed and barricaded.

History
Prior to May 1, 2003, St Juste was known as a "Form 1" crossing, meaning that the crossing was only open to the private companies that needed to use it, and were issued a permit to cross the border without inspection.  The Form 1 program was terminated at that time, and other such crossings were either permanently closed or provided with inspection staff and facilities.

See also
 List of Canada–United States border crossings

References

Canada–United States border crossings
2003 establishments in Maine
2003 establishments in Quebec